14 Squadron or 14th Squadron may refer to:

 No. 14 Squadron PAF, a unit of the Pakistan Air Force
 No. 14 Squadron RAAF, a unit of the Royal Australian Air Force
 No. 14 Squadron (Finland), a unit of the Finnish Air Force
 No. 14 Squadron RAF, a unit of the  Royal Air Force, United Kingdom
 No. 14 Squadron RNZAF, a unit of the Royal New Zealand Air Force
 14th Fighter Squadron (United States), a unit of the United States Air Force
 14th Airlift Squadron (United States), a unit of the United States Air Force